The Colorado State Library (CSL) is the official State Library of Colorado located in Denver, Colorado. Its mission is to help libraries, schools, museums, and other organizations improve services, making it easier for all Coloradans to access and use the materials and information they need for lifelong learning. CSL provides leadership and expertise in developing library-related policies, activities, and assistance for school, public, academic, and special libraries. The primary goal of CSL's efforts is to improve the ability of libraries to provide quality services to all Coloradans. The purpose and key responsibilities of CSL are defined in Colorado Library Law and further refined by goals and strategies set forth in the five-year Library Services and Technology Plan. CSL and the projects it supports and helps administer for publicly-funded libraries across the state of Colorado are funded in part by the Library Services and Technology Act (LSTA) grant funds, which are administered by the Institute of Museum and Library Services (IMLS). 

CSL manages the Colorado Talking Book Library (CTBL), the Colorado State Publications Library (CoSPL), Networking & Resource Sharing (NRS), Library Research Service (LRS) the Office of Library Development & Innovation which provides library development opportunities for public and school libraries, and the Office of Institutional Library Development which provides library development opportunities to institutional libraries. Services such as the Colorado Virtual Library and Colorado Historic Newspapers Collection are examples of the power behind library partnerships, cooperative purchasing, and web-based resources designed to meet multi-type library needs. It also maintains an archive of information produced by the state government which has over 140,000 documents.

History
The Territorial Library and Cabinet was created on November 6, 1861. The Territorial Superintendent of Public Schools was named the Ex Officio Librarian. This institution became the state library when Colorado became a U. S. state in 1876.  In 1899 the State Board of Library Commissioners was formed to improve and support public library services in the state. In 1929 the State Board of Library Commissioners merged with the Colorado Traveling Library Commission which had been established by the local State Federation of Women's Clubs in 1903. This new agency was called the Colorado Library Commission until 1933 when it became the Colorado State Library.

References

External links

State libraries of the United States
1861 establishments in Colorado Territory
Organizations based in Denver
Libraries established in 1861
Government agencies established in 1861
Libraries in Colorado
State agencies of Colorado
Public libraries in Colorado